The first netbook offering by Gigabyte, the M912, is a hybrid netvertible Tablet PC device, was released in 2008. It features an Intel Atom processor and comes preloaded with either Windows XP, Windows Vista or a customised Linux distribution. The hardware varies slightly depending on the OS chosen. The Linux Version for example does not include Bluetooth and has a lower resolution screen. Press accounts suggest that there may be significant heat and speed issues compared with other netbooks. Other criticisms focus on Gigabyte's choice to ship one variant with Windows Vista Home Basic, which lacks official Tablet PC support.

Features and variations
Common features:
8.9" Touchscreen
Windows models:
CCFL backlit 1280x768 display
Linux models, and possibly M912T:
LED backlit 1024x600 display
2.5 Inch HDD Bay
ExpressCard slot
4-in-1 card reader: Secure Digital/MMC/Memory Stick/MS Pro †
1GB SO-DIMM
1.6 GHz Intel Atom
Intel 945GSE Express Chipset+ICH7M

Variations include two models running Windows XP Home (M912X) and Windows Vista Home Basic (M912V) with a 160GB hard drive and a screen resolution of 1280x768. The Ubuntu Linux version, M912M, is expected to ship with a 1024x600 screen resolution and 80GB hard drive. Another, the M912S, is expected to ship with a 4GB SSD. Another expected model, the M912T, is believed to have DVB-T support. While the Linux powered models are expected to ship with substantially lower screen-resolutions, their screens feature energy saving LED-backlights.

Good OS inc, has revealed that the Gigabyte M912 will be the first netbook to be offered with their "Cloud" instant on browser based operating system, that will add instant on internet access to the M912 touch screen netbook.

See also
Cloud (operating system)
Netbook
Comparison of netbooks
Internet appliance

References

External links
Official site

Subnotebooks
Netbooks
Gigabyte Technology